Peter Robinson (born 4 September 1957) is an English former professional footballer who played as a central defender.

After retiring from professional football, Robinson went on to become a Physical Education teacher at Bebside Middle School and later The Blyth School Community College in Blyth, Northumberland. He retired from teaching in at the end of the school year in 2012.

References

1957 births
Living people
People from Newbiggin-by-the-Sea
Footballers from Northumberland
English footballers
English expatriate footballers
Association football defenders
Burnley F.C. players
Sparta Rotterdam players
Blyth Spartans A.F.C. players
Rochdale A.F.C. players
Darlington F.C. players
Halifax Town A.F.C. players
English Football League players
Eredivisie players
Expatriate footballers in the Netherlands
English expatriate sportspeople in the Netherlands